Manual Arts High School is a secondary public school in Los Angeles, California, United States.

History

Manual Arts High School was founded in 1910 in the middle of bean fields, one-half mile from the nearest bus stop. It was the third high school in Los Angeles, California after Los Angeles High School and L.A. Polytechnic High School, and is the oldest high school still on its original site in the Los Angeles Unified School District.  The school that would eventually become Lincoln High had been founded decades earlier but was still an elementary school at this time.

One of the school's first teachers was Ethel Percy Andrus (1911 - 1915).  In 1916 Dr. Andrus became California's first woman high school principal at Lincoln High School in East Los Angeles.  She later founded AARP.

After three semesters in an abandoned grammar school building, Manual Arts High School was opened on Vermont Avenue. After the 1933 Long Beach earthquake, the entire campus was rebuilt, constituting the present Manual Arts High School campus adjacent to the Los Angeles Memorial Coliseum and USC.

It was in the Los Angeles City High School District until 1961, when it merged into LAUSD.

In 1995, "The Arts" became a Pacific Bell Education First Demonstration Site joining thirteen other demonstration sites in California, and in 1996 the school was named a California Distinguished School. In 1998, Manual Arts was officially granted Digital High School status.

The 2005–2006 school year opened with small learning communities (SLCs), three on each track totaling nine SLCs. Manual Arts was relieved by the opening of Santee Education Complex in 2005.

West Adams High School
The school was relieved in 2007 when West Adams Preparatory High School opened. During the same year, a section of the Manual Arts attendance zone was transferred to Belmont High School.

In July 2008, the school became part of MLA Partner Schools through LAUSD's newly created iDesign Schools Division. MLA Partner Schools, in collaboration with West Ed, will operate Manual Arts on a 5-year performance contract approved by the LAUSD School Board.

The school was expected be relieved by Central Region High School 16 (which became Dr. Maya Angelou High School (Los Angeles, California)) when that school opened in 2011, and by Augustus Hawkins High School when that school opens in 2012.

In the 2011–2012 school year, Manual Arts will return to a traditional school calendar schedule. As a result, several of the school's small learning communities will be restructured and the number of security on campus will be reduced. The  'Blewett Football Field is named in honor of James Blewett who was a standout  Manual Arts football player and longtime Head coach with 9 Los Angeles City titles and 225 wins.

Student body
The racial make-up of the school is mostly Latinos and African-Americans and the neighborhood surrounding the school reflects the same make-up.

During the 2004–2005 school year, MAHS had 3,766 students, including:
 3,054 Hispanics (81.1%)
 701 African-Americans (18.6%)
 5 White Americans (1%)
 4 Asian Americans (1%)
 2 Native Americans (1%)

As of 2010, the dropout rate at Manual Arts was 68%. More than 90% of students qualified for free or reduced-price lunch provided by the Los Angeles Unified School District.

Students may purchase school supplies, snacks, drinks and other items at the Manual Arts Student Store.

Notable alumni

 Jon Arnett, football player, member of College Football Hall of Fame, class of 1952
 Gus Arriola, cartoonist and creator of Gordo, class of 1935
 Verna Arvey, musician and writer
 Roy L. Ash, (1918–2012), president of Litton Industries, budget director
 Ted Bates, football player
 Paul Blair (baseball), professional baseball player, Yankees, Orioles, Reds
 Lyman Bostock, professional baseball player, class of 1968
 Steve Broussard, former NFL running back, class of 1985
 Nacio Herb Brown, songwriter, class of 1914
 Yvonne Brathwaite Burke, member of the United States House of Representatives and the Los Angeles County Board of Supervisors, class of 1950
 Frank Capra, film director
 Leland Curtis, artist, environmentalist, and Antarctic explorer
 Jimmy Doolittle, World War II aviator, class of 1914
 Carl Earn (1921–2007), tennis player 
 Tom Fears, Pro Football Hall of Fame, Los Angeles Rams, class of 1941
 Earl C. Gay (1902–1975), Los Angeles City Council member, 1933–45
 Kathryn Grayson, singer and film actress
 Philip Guston, artist, class of 1930
 Robin Harris, comedian and actor, class of 1971
 Ed Heinemann, self-taught aerospace engineer and aircraft designer for Douglas Aircraft Company.
 Virginia Jaramillo, painter
 Jimmie Jones, football player
 Reuben Kadish, artist, class of 1930
Lynton Richards Kistler (1897–1993), lithography printmaker, artist.
 Goodwin Knight, 31st governor of California, class of 1914
Stanley Knowles, Canadian Member of Parliament and New Democratic Party House Leader
 Leo K. Kuter, film art director
 Mittie Lawrence, actress
 Woodley Lewis, football player
 Ned Mathews, football player
 Gerson Mayen, midfielder for Chivas USA of Major League Soccer, class of 2005
 Jimmie McDaniel, African American tennis player and track and field athlete
 Ernie Orsatti, outfielder for the St. Louis Cardinals
 Victor Orsatti, Hollywood agent, film and television producer
 Dwayne O'Steen, football player
 Jerry D. Page, United States Air Force General, class of 1932
 Dwayne Polee, former professional basketball player, class of 1981
 Jackson Pollock, artist, class of 1930 (left before graduation)
 Marie Prevost, actress, class of 1916
 Mark Ridley-Thomas, Los Angeles Board of Supervisors member, class of 1972
 Rachel Robinson,  American former professor and registered nurse, as well as the widow of professional baseball player Jackie Robinson
 Eugene Selznick (1930–2012), Hall of Fame volleyball player
 Oscar Sorto, MLS player for the Los Angeles Galaxy, class of 2012
 Andre Spencer (1964–2020), basketball player
 Scott Stephen, football player
 Irving Stone, author
 John Floyd Thomas Jr., serial killer
 Lawrence Tibbett, baritone, Metropolitan Opera, class of 1914
 Paul Winfield, actor

References

External links
 Manual Arts High School website

Educational institutions established in 1910
Los Angeles Unified School District schools
High schools in Los Angeles
Public high schools in California
1910 establishments in California
Exposition Park (Los Angeles neighborhood)